Provincial Road 391 (PR 391) is an all-weather gravel road connecting Thompson and Lynn Lake, in the Canadian province of Manitoba. PR 391 is located in the Wapisu Range. PR 391 passes through Leaf Rapids a community situated northwest of Thompson. Lynn Lake is the last town PR 391 traverses, where it ends at an intersection with PR 394 and PR 396. 

The designation of PR 391 was applied in 1966, running from Highway 10 in Simonhouse, using modern-day Highway 39 to Wekusko Lake. It also used modern-day Highway 6 between Highway 39 and Thompson, where a spur to Thompson Airport was designated as Provincial Road 382, a short spur outside of the city. By 1970, PR 382 was absorbed into PR 391. The construction of the section of PR 391 between Lynn Lake and Thompson was done between 1970 and 1974.

Route description 

PR 391 begins at the at-grade interchange with Burntwood Road as a divided continuation of Highway 6 in the city of Thompson. Known as Mystery Lake Road, PR 391 becomes the major arterial through Thompson, passing the Burntwood Regional Health Authority Hospital. The route bends north through Thompson, passing through the main commercial district at the intersection with Thompson Drive. After Thompson Drive, PR 391 turns northeast and leaves the city center of Thompson, crossing over Mystery Lake. The route winds northward as it passes the Thompson Golf Club and reaches the access road to Thompson Municipal Airport. After passing southwest of the runways, PR 391 reaches a junction with the western terminus of PR 280, which brings people to Gillam.

After PR 280, PR 391 becomes a two-lane gravel road through the uninhabited portions of northern Manitoba. The route runs northwest and west for various points until reaching the area of Mooswuchi Lake. There the route bends southwest and starts winding west until reaching a junction with a local road that connects to Nelson House. PR 391 passes south along the tip of Kawaweyak Lake and continues winding westward for several kilometres until reaching Wapisu Lake, where it starts jumping over various bodies of water over six bridges from east to west, popping out south of Mooswu Lake. At this point, PR 391 starts running northwest until Suwanee Lake. The route turns northward at the Suwanee River, passing Turnbull Lake before reaching the town of Leaf Rapids.

Through Leaf Rapids, PR 391 runs along the western side of town, intersecting with several local roads that connect to the center of the community, such as Mistik Road and Muhekun Road. The latter connects PR 391 to the town hall for Leaf Rapids. The route crosses past Mistik Road again before reaching a junction with PR 493 (Mine Road), which connects to South Indian Lake. Leaving Leaf Rapids, PR 391 crosses over the Churchill River and passes east of the Leaf Rapids Airport, which consists of one runway. After Leaf Rapids, the route runs northward for several kilometres, making the next bend to the northwest at Scotland Lake. Passing Adam Lake and Conrad Lake, the route winds west through northern Manitoba before turning northwest at Gap Lake.

PR 391 continues northwest it approaches Lynn Lake.  Passing north of the local railway junction, the route turns southwest and enters downtown Lynn Lake. Within downtown Lynn Lake, PR 391 reaches a junction with the northern terminus of PR 399 (Canoe Street). Gaining the moniker of Sherritt Avenue, the route runs southwest through downtown, reaching a junction with PR 394 (Silver Street) and PR 396 (Sherritt Avenue). This junction marks the northern terminus of PR 391. PR 394 runs north through Lynn Lake to the Saskatchewan provincial line while PR 396 continues southwest to Fox Lake.

History 

In 1961, the province of Manitoba declared the section of modern-day Highway 39 from Simonhouse to Wekusko Lake as a gravel road and a section of modern-day Highway 6 from the lake to Opswagon Lake paralleling the Grand Trunk Railway as a flat-earth road, while there a finished stretch in the area of Thompson as a gravel road, with a spur to Mystery Lake. By 1966, the sections had been designated as Provincial Road 391 (PR 391) from Simonhouse to Thompson, while the spur to Mystery Lake and the Thompson Airport was designated as PR 382. By 1969, the section of modern-day PR 391 from Lynn Lake to the shores of the Churchill River near Leaf Rapids was constructed as an all-weather road. The next year, the route had been extended to the Suwanee River and designated as part of PR 391. The section between the Suwanee River and Thompson was also proposed as a new all-weather road while PR 382 between Thompson and the airport was decommissioned and absorbed into PR 391.

PR 391 was completed the next year from the airport westward to an area several kilometres northwest. By 1973, PR 391 was extended westward to a creek from Footprint Lake with a span to Nelson House. Finally, the road was completed between the Suwanee River and the creek, marking the completion between Lynn Lake and Thompson. In 1987, PR 391 was truncated back all the way to Thompson and replaced with Highway 39 from Simonhouse to Wekusko Lake and Highway 6 between Wekusko Lake and the southern border of Thompson.

Junction list

References

External links 

Provincial Trunk Highway and Provincial Road Locations - Government of Manitoba

391
Thompson, Manitoba
Gravel roads